Proteolipid protein 1 (PLP1) is a form of myelin proteolipid protein (PLP). Mutations in PLP1 are associated with Pelizaeus–Merzbacher disease.  It is a 4 transmembrane domain protein which is proposed to bind other copies of itself on the extracellular side of the membrane. In a myelin sheath, as the layers of myelin wraps come together, PLP will bind itself and tightly hold the cellular membranes together.

This gene encodes a transmembrane proteolipid protein that is the predominant myelin protein present in the central nervous system (CNS). The encoded protein functions in myelination. This protein may play a role in the compaction, stabilization, and maintenance of myelin sheaths, as well as in oligodendrocyte development and axonal survival. Mutations associated with this gene cause X-linked Pelizaeus–Merzbacher disease and spastic paraplegia type 2. Two transcript variants encoding distinct isoforms have been identified for this gene.

In melanocytic cells PLP1 gene expression may be regulated by MITF.

Interactions
Proteolipid protein 1 has been shown to interact with Myelin basic protein.

See also
 PLP2

References

Further reading

External links
 
 GeneReview/NCBI/NIH/UW entry on PLP1-Related Disorders